Fernandocrambus euryptellus is a moth in the family Crambidae. It was described by Carlos Berg in 1877 and is found in Argentina.

References

Crambini
Moths described in 1877
Moths of South America